Binilith Satano Mahenge (born 1 April 1962) is a Tanzanian CCM politician and Member of Parliament for Makete constituency since 2005. He is the current Minister of State in the Vice President's Office for Environment.

References

1962 births
Living people
Tanzanian engineers
Chama Cha Mapinduzi MPs
Tanzanian MPs 2005–2010
Tanzanian MPs 2010–2015
Government ministers of Tanzania
Mazengo Secondary School alumni